Capoeta gracilis is a species of fish in the family Cyprinidae found in Western Asia. It is part of the large-scaled Capoeta capoeta clade or complex of species in the genus Capoeta.

References

Capoeta
Fish described in 1861